Dakota (Dakhótiyapi, Dakȟótiyapi), also referred to as Dakhota, is a Siouan language spoken by the Dakota people of the Sioux tribes. Dakota is closely related to and mutually intelligible with the Lakota language. It is critically endangered, with only around 290 fluent speakers left out of an ethnic population of almost 20,000.

Morphology

Nouns
Dakota, similar to many Native American languages, is a mainly polysynthetic language, meaning that different morphemes in the form of affixes can be combined to form a single word. Nouns in Dakota can be broken down into two classes, primitive and derivative. Primitive nouns are nouns whose origin cannot be deduced from any other word (for example make or earth, peta or fire, and ate or father), while derivative nouns are nouns that are formed in various ways from words of other grammatical categories. Primitive nouns stand on their own and are separate from other words. Derivative nouns, on the other hand, are formed by the addition of affixes to words in other grammatical categories, such as verbs, adjectives, and other nouns.

Verbs
Verbs in Dakota can appropriate, through agglutination and synthesis, many of the pronominal, prepositional, and adverbial or modal affixes of the language. There are many verbal roots, all of which are only used once certain causative prefixes are added, forming participles. Like in English, Dakota verbs also have three persons, the first, the second, and the third. Person is indicated through the addition (first and second person) or subtraction (third person, the verb is used in its simplest form) of personal pronoun affixes. There are two forms of tense in the language, the aorist (sometimes called the indefinite) and the future. In order to express the future tense, the words kta or kte are placed after the verb, much in contrast to expressing the aorist tense, which requires no marking, but is instead derived from the context of what is being said.

Possessive pronouns and pronominal affixes
In order to show possession in Dakota, a possessive pronoun must be prefixed onto whichever noun is being possessed. Two forms of possessive nouns occur, the natural class and the artificial or alienable class. Natural class pronouns express possession that cannot be alienated, and when prefixed to a noun, signifies the different parts of one's self. For example, the possessive natural article pronoun mi-, which means "my," can be added to nouns such as "eye," in miista, or "words," in mioie. Meanwhile, artificial possessive pronouns are used to signify property and possessions that can be transferred or traded. For example, the artificial pronoun ta- or ti-, which is equivalent to the singular her or him, can be prefixed onto nouns such as "bow," in tinazipe, and "friend," in takodaku.

Syntax

Nouns and verbs
Dakota is mainly a subject-object-verb (SOV) language, where nouns, whether they are the subject or object, always come before the verb. And when two nouns are used in the same clause,  where one is the subject and the other is the object, the subject is most usually placed first. Verbs are also usually placed after adjectives that are used to qualify either the subject or the object and adverbs that qualify the verb. When additional words are used within a clause that are not either nouns or verbs, the nouns, both subject and object, are always placed at the beginning of the clause.

Dialects

Dakota has two major dialects with two sub-dialects each:

 Eastern Dakota ( Santee-Sisseton or Dakhóta)
 Santee (Isáŋyáthi: Bdewákhaŋthuŋwaŋ, Waȟpékhute)
 Sisseton (Sisíthuŋwaŋ, Waȟpéthuŋwaŋ)
 Western Dakota (a.k.a. Yankton-Yanktonai or Dakȟóta/Dakhóta, and erroneously classified, for a very long time, as "Nakota")
 Yankton (Iháŋktȟuŋwaŋ)
 Yanktonai (Iháŋktȟuŋwaŋna)
 Upper Yanktonai (Wičhíyena)

The two dialects differ phonologically, grammatically, and to a large extent, also lexically. They are mutually intelligible to a high extent, although Western Dakota is lexically closer to the Lakota language with which it has higher mutual intelligibility.

Writing systems

For a comparative table of the various writing systems conceived over time for the Sioux languages, cf. the specific section of the article Sioux language.

Phonology

Vowels
Dakota has five oral vowels, and three nasal vowels, .

Consonants

Comparison of the dialects

Phonological differences

In respect to phonology Eastern and Western Dakota differ particularly in consonant clusters. The table below gives the possible consonant clusters and shows the differences between the dialects:

The two dialects also differ in the diminutive suffix (-daŋ in Santee, and -na in Yankton-Yanktonai and in Sisseton) and in a number of other phonetic issues that are harder to categorize. The following table gives examples of words that differ in their phonology.

Lexical differences
There are also numerous lexical differences between the two Dakota dialects as well as between the sub-dialects. Yankton-Yanktonai is in fact lexically closer to the Lakota language than it is to Santee-Sisseton. The following table gives some examples:

Grammatical differences

Yankton-Yanktonai has the same three ablaut grades as Lakota (a, e, iŋ), while in Santee-Sisseton there are only two (a, e). This significantly impacts word forms, especially in fast speech and it is another reason why Yankton-Yanktonai has better mutual intelligibility with Lakota than with Santee-Sisseton.

Some examples:

There are other grammatical differences between the dialects.

Revitalization efforts and resources

Software and mobile apps for learning Dakhóta
A Dakota 1 app was previously available for iPhone, iPad, and other iOS devices. The Association on American Indian Affairs website offers an extensive selection of Dakotah learning resources, including CDs, DVDs, flashcards, and software.

Curriculum, textbooks, and other materials for teaching and learning Dakhóta
A Level 1 Speak Dakota! textbook is available from the Dakhóta Iápi Okhódakičhiye. Developed by Dakota language speakers, teachers, and linguists, the textbook is the first fully illustrated Dakota language textbook that is linguistically and pedagogically consistent. Dakota language learning materials are also available on their website.

References

Bibliography

 DeMallie, Raymond J. (2001). Sioux until 1850. In R. J. DeMallie (Ed.), Handbook of North American Indians: Plains (Vol. 13, Part 2, pp. 718–760). W. C. Sturtevant (Gen. Ed.). Washington, D.C.: Smithsonian Institution. .
 Parks, Douglas R.; & Rankin, Robert L. (2001). The Siouan languages. In Handbook of North American Indians: Plains (Vol. 13, Part 1, pp. 94–114). Washington, D.C.: Smithsonian Institution.
 de Reuse, Willem J. (1987). One hundred years of Lakota linguistics (1887–1987). Kansas Working Papers in Linguistics, 12, 13-42.
 de Reuse, Willem J. (1990). A supplementary bibliography of Lakota languages and linguistics (1887–1990). Kansas Working Papers in Linguistics, 15 (2), 146-165. (Studies in Native American languages 6).
Rood, David S.; & Taylor, Allan R. (1996). Sketch of Lakhota, a Siouan language. In Handbook of North American Indians: Languages (Vol. 17, pp. 440–482). Washington DC: Smithsonian Institution.

Riggs, S.R., & Dorsey, J.O. (Ed.). (1973). Dakota grammar, texts, and ethnography. Minneapolis: Ross & Haines, Inc.
Shaw, P.A. (1980). Theoretical issues in Dakota phonology and morphology. New York: Garland Publishing, Inc.

External links 
 Dakota Language Texts, from the Boston Athenæum: Schoolcraft Collection of Books in Native American Languages. Digital Collection.

Dakota culture
Native American language revitalization
Western Siouan languages
Indigenous languages of Minnesota